Coast Line may refer to:
 Coast Line (Union Pacific Railroad), a railroad line in California, United States
 Coast Line (Denmark), a railroad line
 Coast Line (Sri Lanka), a railroad line

See also
 Coastline
 Coast Lines, a shipping company in the United Kingdom, Ireland, and the Channel Islands from 1917 to 1971
 East Coast Line (disambiguation)
 West Coast Line (disambiguation)